The 1970 Pepsi-Cola ILTF Grand Prix was a tennis circuit administered by the International Lawn Tennis Federation (ILTF) which served as a forerunner to the current Association of Tennis Professionals (ATP) World Tour and the Women's Tennis Association (WTA) Tour. It was the inaugural edition of the Grand Prix circuit and consisted of men's tournaments recognised by the ILTF. The creation of the Grand Prix circuit, on an experimental basis during its first year, was announced in April 1970 by the president of the ILTF, Ben Barnett. It was the brainchild of Jack Kramer, former tennis promoter and winner of the Wimbledon and US championships, and was aimed at countering the influence of commercial promoters, particularly Lamar Hunt and his World Championship Tennis circuit and George MacCall's National Tennis League.

The tournaments were graded in one of three categories which determined the number of ranking points available: Class A, comprising the three Grand Slam tournaments, Class 1 and Class 2. The Pepsi-Cola Masters and Davis Cup Final are included in this calendar but did not count towards the Grand Prix. In addition to the tournament prize money a bonus pool of $150,000 was available for the top 20 ranked players. The bonus pool was jointly funded by Pepsi-Cola as title sponsor and the participating tournaments which reserved 10% of their prize money. Cliff Richey earned $25,000 bonus as the winner of the first Grand Prix circuit. At the end of the season the top six ranked players qualified for a Masters round-robin tournament held in Tokyo which was won by Stan Smith.

All open tennis tournaments were eligible to be included in the Grand Prix circuit provided they committed to not paying any management fees to commercial organizations with players under contract. Originally the Italian Championships, played in April in Rome, was part of the Grand Prix calendar but it was withdrawn during the tournament when it became known that they had paid management fees to the competing World Championship Tennis organization.

Schedule
Key

April

May

June

July

August

September

October

November

December

Grand Prix point system
The tournaments listed above were divided into three categories. Class A consisted of the Grand Slams while the other tournaments were divided into Class 1 and Class 2. Points were allocated based on these groups and the finishing position of a player in a tournament. Ties were settled by the number of tournaments played. The points allocation is listed below:

Grand Prix rankings

List of tournament winners
The list of winners and number of singles titles won (Grand Slams and Masters in bold text), alphabetically by last name:
  Arthur Ashe (3) Australian Open, Berkeley, Paris Indoor
  Mark Cox (1) Bournemouth
  Dick Crealy (1) Båstad
  Željko Franulović (1) Buenos Aires
  Jan Kodeš (1) French Open
  Rod Laver (4) Louisville, South Orange, Los Angeles, Wembley
  John Newcombe (1) Wimbledon
  Cliff Richey (2) Washington, Indianapolis
  Tony Roche (2) Gstaad, Boston
  Ray Ruffels (1) Merion
  Ken Rosewall (2) Cincinnati, US Open
 Manuel Santana (1) Barcelona
  Stan Smith (3) Phoenix, Stockholm, Pepsi-Cola Masters

The list of winners and number of doubles titles won (Grand Slams and Masters in bold text), last name alphabetically:
  Arthur Ashe (3) Indianapolis, Stockholm, Pepsi-Cola Masters
  Pierre Barthès (2) Munich, US Open
  William Bowrey (1) Merion
  Bob Carmichael (1) Buenos Aires
  Patricio Cornejo (1) South Orange
  Dick Crealy (2) Båstad, Phoenix
  Owen Davidson (1) Munich
  Roy Emerson (1) Boston
  Jaime Fillol (1) South Orange
  Clark Graebner (1) Indianapolis
  Bob Hewitt (1) Washington
  Rod Laver (1) Boston
  Bob Lutz (2) Australian Open, Berkeley
  Frew McMillan (1) Washington
  Ilie Năstase (2) French Open, Cincinnati
  John Newcombe (2) Wimbledon, Louisville
  Tom Okker (2) Bournemouth, Los Angeles
  Nikola Pilić (1) US Open
  Marty Riessen (1) Los Angeles
  Tony Roche (3) Bournemouth, Wimbledon, Louisville
  Ken Rosewall (1) London
  Ray Ruffels (3) Merion, Phoenix, Buenos Aires
  Stan Smith (5) Australian Open, Berkeley, London, Stockholm, Pepsi-Cola Masters
  Allan Stone (1) Båstad
  Ion Ţiriac (2) French Open, Cincinnati

The list of winners and number of mixed doubles titles won (Grand Slams and Masters in bold text), alphabetically by last name:
  Bob Hewitt (2) Bournemouth, French Open
  Ilie Năstase (1) Wimbledon
  Marty Riessen (1) US Open

The following players won their first singles title in 1970:
 Dick Crealy Båstad
 Jan Kodeš French Open

See also
 1970 World Championship Tennis circuit

Notes

References
General

Specific

Further reading

 
Grand Prix tennis circuit seasons
Grand Prix